Franco Ezequiel Paredes (born 18 March 1999) is an Argentine professional footballer who plays as a centre-back for River Plate.

Career
Paredes joined River Plate in 2007. He made the jump from academy to reserves in 2016, before making his breakthrough into the first-team under Marcelo Gallardo in February 2020. Paredes was soon registered for the Copa Libertadores, a competition that would see him make his senior debut in on 4 March 2020 against L.D.U. Quito; he played the full duration as River lost 3–0, with ten men, in Group D. In August, Paredes was loaned to fellow Primera División club Defensa y Justicia. Hernán Crespo gave him his first appearance in the Libertadores too, as they lost away to Santos on 21 October.

Personal life
Paredes' cousin, Leandro, is also a professional footballer.

Career statistics

Notes

References

External links

1999 births
Living people
People from La Matanza Partido
Argentine footballers
Association football defenders
Club Atlético River Plate footballers
Defensa y Justicia footballers
Sportspeople from Buenos Aires Province